Yoritaka is both a masculine Japanese given name and a Japanese surname.

Possible writings
Yoritaka can be written using different combinations of kanji characters. Here are some examples: 

頼隆, "rely, noble"
頼孝, "rely, filial piety"
頼貴, "rely, precious"
頼崇, "rely, respect"
頼高, "rely, tall"
頼昂, "rely, rise"
依隆, "to depend on, noble"
依孝, "to depend on, filial piety"
依貴, "to depend on, precious"
依崇, "to depend on, respectt"
依高, "to depend on, tall"
依昂, "to depend on, rise"

The name can also be written in hiragana よりたか or katakana ヨリタカ.

Notable people with the given name Yoritaka
, Japanese samurai 
, Japanese daimyō

Notable people with the surname Yoritaka
, Japanese politician

Japanese-language surnames
Japanese masculine given names